The Dannie Heineman Prize for Astrophysics is jointly awarded each year by the American Astronomical Society and American Institute of Physics for outstanding work in astrophysics. It is funded by the Heineman Foundation in honour of Dannie Heineman.

Recipients
Source: AAS

See also
 Dannie Heineman Prize for Mathematical Physics
 List of astronomy awards
 List of physics awards
 Prizes named after people

References

Astronomy prizes
Awards of the American Institute of Physics
Awards established in 1980
American Astronomical Society